Mecyclothorax vitreus is a species of ground beetle in the subfamily Psydrinae. It was described by Britton in 1948.

References

vitreus
Beetles described in 1948